Those Were the Days (4 個 32A 和一個香蕉少年) is a 1996 Hong Kong film directed by Eric Tsang. It is a coming-of-age story about four friends who went to an all-girls secondary school together.

Cast
 Jordan Chan - Super
 Julian Cheung - Chan Yan Kin (teacher)
 Josie Ho - Liu Man Sze (Minnie's oldest sister)
 Annie Man - young Patricia
 Kong Lai Na (Leila Tong) - young Minnie Liu
 Amanda Lee - Informant
 Loletta Lee - adult Minnie Liu
 Karen Mok - adult Patricia
 Rick Tan - Stripper Roommate
 Lillian Ho - Bamboo (student)
 Eric Tsang - Mr. Liu (Minnie's Father)
 Hilary Tsui - Liu Heung (Minnie's older sister)
 Linda Wong - Bamboo
 Chin Kar Lok

External links
 
 HK cinemagic entry

1996 films
Hong Kong drama films
Films with screenplays by James Yuen
Films directed by Eric Tsang
1990s Hong Kong films